Michael James Husted (born June 16, 1970) is a former American football placekicker who played in the National Football League. He played nine seasons with four teams.  His first six seasons were with the Tampa Bay Buccaneers. He also played for the Oakland Raiders, the Washington Redskins, and the Kansas City Chiefs. He retired after the 2002 season.

High school
Husted played high school football at Hampton High School in Virginia.  During his time, the team played in three state championship games, winning two. Husted earned several awards during his high school career:
 Parade All American Honorable mention (Senior year)
 First-team All State Kicker (Senior and Junior years)
 First-team All Region Kicker (Senior and Junior years)
 First-team All District Kicker (Senior and Junior years)

College
Husted attended the University of Virginia, where was the kickoff specialist during his freshman and sophomore seasons. He then handled all kicking duties his junior and senior seasons.

During his senior campaign, he connected on 13-16 field goals and was named a Lou Groza semi-finalist. Husted also had a total of 95 touchbacks during his college career, the most in UVA history.

NFL
Husted played in the NFL for 9 years. Despite being an undrafted free agent, Husted was signed by the Tampa Bay Buccaneers. He went on to have a successful rookie season, and was named to Football Digest’s All Rookie team.

During his time with the Tampa Bay Buccaneers, Michael established several team records including:
 All-time leading scorer (502 pts.)
 Longest field goal (57 yards)
 Most 50+ field goals (10)

Post-football career
After his NFL career, Husted was involved in an online start up, "iPlayers.net" in 2005. After the company was acquired by Active Network, LLC in 2007, Husted returned to the athletic and educational world.

Husted subsequently founded "National Camp Series", a series of kicking camps around the country that uses professional kicking coaches. The National Camp Series (NCS) KIX Player Ratings System uses historical data to determine a kickers comparative ranking.

References

1970 births
Living people
People from El Paso, Texas
American football placekickers
Virginia Cavaliers football players
Tampa Bay Buccaneers players
Oakland Raiders players
Washington Redskins players
Kansas City Chiefs players
Hampton High School (Virginia) alumni